Andy Haigh (born 3 September 1975) is an English former professional rugby league footballer who played in the 1990s.

Background
Haigh was born in Warrington, Cheshire, England. He played amateur rugby at Crosfields ARLFC a club he still has links with as the junior welfare officer.

Playing career
Andy Haigh played right -, i St. Helens' 32-22 victory over the Bradford Bulls in the 1997 Challenge Cup Final at Wembley Stadium, London on Saturday 3 May 1997, in front of a crowd of 78,022.
After retiring from Rugby Andy took up a career in strength and conditioning, where he worked for Wigan RLFC, Widnes RLFC and Salford RLFC. Andy left professional  sport in 2011 to start a new career in  medical devices.

References

External links

1975 births
Living people
English rugby league players
Rugby league centres
Rugby league fullbacks
Rugby league locks
Rugby league players from Warrington
Rugby league second-rows
Rugby league wingers
St Helens R.F.C. players